The 1938 Tennessee gubernatorial election was held on November 8, 1938. Democratic nominee Prentice Cooper defeated Republican nominee Howard Baker Sr. with 71.72% of the vote.

Primary elections
Primary elections were held on August 4, 1938.

Democratic primary

Candidates
Prentice Cooper, State Senator
Gordon Browning, incumbent Governor
Roy Wallace
J. Bailey Wray

Results

General election

Candidates
Prentice Cooper, Democratic
Howard Baker Sr., Republican

Results

References

1938
Tennessee
Gubernatorial